Vsevolod Vladimirovich Ovchinnikov (November 17, 1926 – August 30, 2021) was a Soviet and Russian journalist and writer-publicist, one of the leading Soviet postwar international journalists; orientalist and expert on Japan and China.

Ovchinnikov was born in Leningrad. For nearly forty years he was a correspondent and political columnist for Pravda, and was a columnist in the Rossiyskaya Gazeta.

Author of books A Branch of Sakura (The Story of What Kind of People the Japanese) (1970), Roots of Oak (Impressions and Thoughts about England and the English) (1980), Hot Ashes (Chronicle of a Secret Race for the Possession of Nuclear Weapons). For these books in 1985 he was awarded the State Prize of the USSR.

He was an honorary member of the Russian-Japanese Committee of the 21st century, the political expert peer network Kremlin.org.

From 1953 to 1960 he worked as a special correspondent of Pravda in China, from 1962 to 1968 - in Japan, from 1974 to 1978 - in the UK.

In addition, there are short-term missions in the United States, Nicaragua, Mexico, Indonesia, and India. Reports from these countries are united in the book The Element of Race.

Ovchinnikov twice traveled to Tibet (1955, 1990).

Reports and essays Ovchinnikov devoted mainly to social, political and economic problems around the world - the trade union movement, the national liberation struggle, relations with developing countries by transnational corporations, humanitarian issues.

Ovchinnikov had the opportunity of the first Russians to put flowers on the grave of Richard Sorge.

References

External links
 Всеволод Владимирович Овчинников, People.ru.
 «Калейдоскоп жизни» Всеволода Овчинникова, Новости Института международного права и экономики имени А. С. Грибоедова
 Всеволод Владимирович Овчинников, Электронная библиотека.

1926 births
2021 deaths
Recipients of the USSR State Prize
Journalists from Saint Petersburg
Recipients of the Order of Friendship of Peoples
Russian people of World War II
Soviet journalists
Soviet male writers
20th-century Russian male writers
Russian sinologists
Soviet orientalists
Russian orientalists
Russian columnists